Abdelhak Achik (born March 11, 1959) is a former Moroccan amateur boxer, who won the bronze medal in the men's featherweight (– 57 kg) category at the 1988 Summer Olympics in Seoul.

1988 Olympic results
Below is the record of Abdelhak Achik, a Moroccan featherweight boxer who competed at the 1988 Seoul Olympics:

Round of 64: bye
Round of 32: Defeated Francisco Avelar (El Salvador) by decision, 4-1
Round of 16: Defeated Omar Catari (Venezuela) KO 1
Quarterfinal: Defeated Liu Dong (China) KO 1
Semifinal: Lost to Giovanni Parisi (Italy) referee stopped contest in the first round (was awarded bronze medal)

References
 

1959 births
Living people
Sportspeople from Casablanca
Featherweight boxers
Boxers at the 1988 Summer Olympics
Olympic boxers of Morocco
Olympic bronze medalists for Morocco
Olympic medalists in boxing
Moroccan male boxers
Medalists at the 1988 Summer Olympics
Mediterranean Games gold medalists for Morocco
Mediterranean Games medalists in boxing
Competitors at the 1983 Mediterranean Games
21st-century Moroccan people
20th-century Moroccan people